Constantine "Con" Phillips (1746 – 14 February 1811) was a noted professional cricketer who played for Surrey in the 1760s and 1770s until 1778.

Phillips was born and died in Chelsham, Surrey, and was christened 2 November 1746.  Most of his career took place before cricket's statistical record began with regular scorecards in 1772.  He made five known appearances in first-class cricket matches between 1773 and 1778.

Phillips was primarily a batsman who scored a known total of 117 runs in 10 innings with a highest score of 31.  He has not been credited with any wickets.  He took just 1 catch, which suggests he may have been an outfielder.

Further reading
 Arthur Haygarth, Scores & Biographies, Volume 1 (1744–1826), Lillywhite, 1862

External sources
CricketArchive record of Con Phillips

English cricketers
English cricketers of 1701 to 1786
Surrey cricketers
1746 births
1811 deaths